Walkabout is the fourth studio album by the English new wave band the Fixx, released in 1986. The first single, "Secret Separation", spent two weeks atop the Billboard Album Rock Tracks chart in July 1986; it was the band's second No. 1 single on the chart.

Production
The album was produced by Rupert Hine. Singer Cy Curnin started working on the album while temporarily living in Africa.  Walkabout was the first album to include bass player Danny Brown as an official member of the band.

Critical reception
The Ottawa Citizen called the album "the most well-rounded, honest effort by the group so far, marked by a deliberate attempt to 'uncomplicate' the group's sound, without sacrificing the poignancy of the social messages in the songs." The Los Angeles Times called the album the band's best to that point, writing that "the LP's uninventive slices of quirky new wave, tentative funk and Bowie impersonations could have been worse." The Sun Sentinel wrote that "the Fixx is capable of creating polished but ultimately passionless and perfunctory pop-funk ... this is not a record that anyone's going to remember five years from now."

Track listing
All songs are written by Dan K. Brown, Cy Curnin, Rupert Greenall, Jamie West-Oram, and Adam Woods, except when noted.

"Secret Separation" (Brown, Curnin, Greenall, Jeannette Obstoj, West-Oram, Woods) - 3:51
"Built for the Future" - 4:07
"Treasure It" - 4:38
"Chase the Fire" - 4:27
"Can't Finish" - 4:09
"Walkabout" - 4:35
"One Look Up" - 4:15
"Read Between the Lines" - 3:59
"Sense the Adventure" - 3:42
"Camphor" - 3:53   [with hidden CD track "Peace on Earth (Do What You Can)" - 10:46]

Personnel
Cy Curnin - lead vocals, piano
Adam Woods - drums
Rupert Greenall - keyboard
Jamie West-Oram - guitar, backing vocals
Dan K. Brown - bass

Additional personnel
The TKO Horns:
Geoffrey Blythe - tenor saxophone
Dick Hanson - trumpet
Brian Maurice (credited as 'Brian Morris') - alto saxophone
Jimmy Paterson - trombone

Production
Producer: Rupert Hine
Recording and Mixing Engineer: Stephen W Tayler

Charts

'''Singles

References

The Fixx albums
1986 albums
Albums produced by Rupert Hine
MCA Records albums